Call at Midnight is a 1929 German silent film directed by Mario Bonnard and starring Marcella Albani, Ralph Arthur Roberts, and Curt Bois.

The film's art direction was by Heinrich Richter.

Cast

References

Bibliography

External links

1929 films
Films of the Weimar Republic
Films directed by Mario Bonnard
German silent feature films
German black-and-white films
Bavaria Film films